The 138th Pennsylvania House of Representatives District is located in Southeastern Pennsylvania and has been represented since 2021 by Ann Flood.

District profile 
The 138th District of the Pennsylvania House of Representatives is located in  Northampton County. It includes the Lee and Virginia Graver Arboretum and is made up of the following areas:

 Bangor
 Bushkill Township
 Forks Township
 Chapman
 East Bangor
 Lower Mount Bethel Township
 Moore Township (PART, Districts Eastern and Pt. Phillips)
 Pen Argyl
 Plainfield Township
 Portland
 Roseto
 Stockertown
 Upper Mount Bethel Township
 Washington Township
 Wind Gap

Representatives

Recent election results

References

External links
District map from the United States Census Bureau
Pennsylvania House Legislative District Maps from the Pennsylvania Redistricting Commission.  
Population Data for District 138 from the Pennsylvania Redistricting Commission.

Government of Northampton County, Pennsylvania
138